Doubting Thomas was an industrial band formed by two members of Skinny Puppy: cEvin Key and the late Dwayne Goettel. Although considered a Skinny Puppy side project, nearly all the group's music is instrumental. The band shares its name with an American roots band, to whom they have no relation.

History
Key and Goettel began recording together as Doubting Thomas in 1987, but it was not until the duo had some extra time and label interest from Wax Trax! in 1989 that they were able to begin recording a formal album. In contrast to their material as Skinny Puppy and related side projects, Doubting Thomas was explicitly non-vocal, less structured, and "wandering" in form – Key characterized it as "'cryer music,' like music in a movie."

As Doubting Thomas they released an album and an EP in 1991. The duo continued to record occasionally until 1994; Goettel died in 1995.

The album, The infidel, and the EP Father Don't Cry were re-released as a two disc set, first as a limited edition in 2007, and again in 2013.  Father Don't Cry was extended with additional material recorded between 1987 and 1994.

Several other Doubting Thomas songs were included in compilations.

Discography
 1991 album The Infidel: composed 1987–1990.  Released on the WaxTrax! Record Label.
 1991 single/EP Father Don't Cry: recorded 1990. The song "Father Don't Cry" has also been released on The Infidel.  Released on the WaxTrax! record label.

Releases after Dwayne Goettel's death in 1995

 1997 – Compilation Paradigm Shift, Nettwerk record label.
 1997 – Re-release of Father Don't Cry: with additional material, Metropolis Records label.
 2000 – Compilation Wild Planet included the song "Steps". Nettwerk and Subconscious Communications record labels.
 2007 – Re-release of The Infidel and Father Don't Cry as a 2-disc limited edition on Subconscious Communications.  Father Don't Cry 
 2013 – Re-release of The Infidel and Father Don't Cry as a 2-disc special edition / digital album on Metropolis Records

References

Canadian industrial music groups
Skinny Puppy
Musical groups from Vancouver
Musical groups established in 1987
Musical groups disestablished in 1994
Wax Trax! Records artists
Metropolis Records artists
1987 establishments in British Columbia
1994 disestablishments in British Columbia